Otto Hofner (29 March 1879 – 13 March 1946) was an Austrian sculptor. His work was part art competitions at the 1932 Summer Olympics, the 1936 Summer Olympics, and the 1948 Summer Olympics.

References

1879 births
1946 deaths
20th-century Austrian sculptors
Austrian male sculptors
Olympic competitors in art competitions
Artists from Vienna
20th-century Austrian male artists